Jean-François Coste is a French sailor who competed in and completed the first Vendee Globe in 1989. He gained extensive sailing experience crewing for Eric Tabarly together with fellow Vendée pioneer Philippe Poupon.

References

Living people
French male sailors (sport)
French Vendee Globe sailors
1989 Vendee Globe sailors
Vendée Globe finishers
Single-handed circumnavigating sailors
Year of birth missing (living people)